SHIFT is a two-day international business festival held every year in Turku, Finland, at the Turku Castle. It was first held on May 31 and June 1, 2016. The attendees included over 1,000 visitors, 80 partner companies, 150 startups, and over 20 investors. Around 100 volunteers were part of this event. SHIFT 2017 is slated to be held on May 31 and June 1, 2017.

The SHIFT is backed by companies and the city of Turku, as well as Turku Chamber of Commerce and The Federation of Finnish Enterprises, while the event itself is put together by local JCI members, start-up actives and students.

2016 - First Year 
The 2016 SHIFT business festival had key speakers such as:
 Edward Jung, Founder and Chief Technology Officer, Intellectual Ventures
 Andreas Korczak, Microsoft
 Cecilia Hertz, Founder of Umbilical Design
 Thor Gunnarsson, co-founder, Solfar
 Jonathan Pulitzer, managing director in the energy practice, GE Ventures
 Stephen Lake, CEO, Thalmic Labs
 Mo-El Fatatry, Founder, Masar
 Ravi Belani, Founder, Alchemist Accelerator
 Henrietta Kekäläinen, Founder, Mehackit
 Markus Alholm, CEO, GE Energy Finland
 Oliver Rittgen, CEO, Bayer Nordic SE
 Keiichi Matsuda, Augmented reality designer
 Teemu Arina, Founder, Biohacker Center
 Aape Pohjavirta, Founder, Funzi
 Kristoffer Lawson, Founder, Solu
 Jussi Westergren, co-founder, Virunga Alliance
The business festival also featured performing artists such as:
 Kalle Lehto, Circus performer
 Kimmo Korpela, Breakdance champion
 Anu Halmesmaa, Sculptor
 Alessio de Marchi, Metallurgy sculptor
 Sampo Kurppa, Circus artist
 Masha Sha, Video artist
 Celia Eid and Sebastian Bérangér, Animator and Composers
 Albert Bayona, Visual artist and Cultural promoter
 Alper T İnce, Painter and Video artist
 Inna Demidova-Tuomikoski, Visual artist
 Silja Selonen, Painter and Sculptor
 Zinaïda Lihacheva, Artist
 The Turncoats, Jugglers

2017 Lineup 
The event is scheduled to be held in the Turku Castle, in Turku, Finland, on May 31, 2017, and June 1, 2017.

Neil Harbisson, the avant-garde artist and cyborg activist, was announced as first of the speakers in the event. The other speakers are:
 Alan Laubsch, Founder, National Capital Alliance
 Gerd Leonhard, Author, CEO of the Futures Agency
 Melody Hossaini, Founder and CEO, InspirEngage International
 Lauri Järvilehto, CEO and co-founder, Lightneer; Founder, Filosofian Akatemia
 Cecilia Tham, Entrepreneur, MOB and FabCafe
 Christopher Auel-Welsbach, Founder, Product Manager, Speaker on Artificial Intelligence, Leader of IBM Watson Partner Innovation (Europe)
 Hugh Williams, VP Engineering, Google
 Laila Pawlak, CEO and co-founder, SingularityU Denmark
 Henrik Hautop Lund, Professor, Technical University of Denmark

References 
 Tartu and Turku, sparkling start-up cities! - http://www.turkusciencepark.com/en/spark-news/1481/tartu-and-turku-sparkling-start-cities/
 Exciting Moments at the SHIFT Business Festival - http://www.ambassadornetwork.fi/news-and-events/exciting-moments-shift-business-festival
 The SHIFT Business Festival - Helsinki Think Company - http://thinkcompany.fi/the-shift-business-festival/
 The first SHIFT Business Festival in Turku, Finland, Was a Great Success | Chamber of Commerce - https://www.sttinfo.fi/tiedote/the-first-shift-business-festival-in-turku-finland-was-a-great-success?publisherId=3471&releaseId=47054309
 Business festivals are the new trend in networking | Kauppakamari - https://www.sttinfo.fi/tiedote/business-festivals-are-the-new-trend-in-networking?publisherId=3471&releaseId=44659629
 The SHIFT - International business festival in Turku | UBC Sustainable Cities Commission - http://www.ubc-sustainable.net/events/shift-international-business-festival-turku
Bisnesfestivaali The Shift järjestetään toistamiseen Turun linnassa ensi keväänä - http://www.ts.fi/uutiset/talous/2980637/Bisnesfestivaali+The+Shift+jarjestetaan+toistamiseen+Turun+linnassa+ensi+kevaana
Linnanpuistoon nousee Shift - Yli tuhat osallistujaa - http://www.turkulainen.fi/artikkeli/398113-linnanpuistoon-nousee-shift-yli-tuhat-osallistujaa
The Shift palaa Turun linnaan – tavoitteena tuplata kävijämäärä - http://www.turkulainen.fi/artikkeli/450881-the-shift-palaa-turun-linnaan-tavoitteena-tuplata-kavijamaara
Turun Shift sai valtakunnallisen tunnustuksen - http://www.turkulainen.fi/artikkeli/511878-turun-shift-sai-valtakunnallisen-tunnustuksen
Turun linnan The Shift -businessfestivaali huimassa suosiossa - http://www.turkulainen.fi/artikkeli/381738-turun-linnan-the-shift-businessfestivaali-huimassa-suosiossa
The Shift ylitti odotukset – uutta luvassa ensi vuonna - http://www.turkulainen.fi/artikkeli/400172-the-shift-ylitti-odotukset-uutta-luvassa-ensi-vuonna
Shift i Åbo växer med det dubbla - http://www.abounderrattelser.fi/news/2017/03/shift-i-abo-vaxer-med-det-dubbla.html
The world's first cyborg will be a keynote speaker at Turku's SHIFT festival - exploring the meld of ‘Human & Machine’ - http://nordic.businessinsider.com/the-worlds-first-officially-recognised-cyborg-will-be-a-keynote-speaker-at-turkus-shift-festival-this-week---exploring-the-meld-of-human--machine-2017-5

Technology events
Events in Turku
Festivals established in 2016
Festivals in Finland